The 2021 R-League A Division was the 2nd season of the Rajasthan State Men's League, the first professional league in the Indian state of Rajasthan. It is organised by the Rajasthan Football Association.

The 2nd season kicked off on the 22 July 2021, with 8 teams competing for the title and qualification for the I-League 2nd Division. The 8 teams played once against each other in a round-robin format. The  winner is Zinc FA along with 2nd place Rajasthan United were nominated for I-League 2nd Division by the state FA, Rajasthan United qualified based on sporting merit and participated in the I League qualifiers.

Teams 
A total of 8 teams participated in the league.

Standings

References 

Football in Rajasthan